WKOG-LP was a religious television station in Indianapolis, Indiana, broadcasting locally on UHF channel 31 as an affiliate of the Eternal Word Television Network. WKOG-LP was owned by Kingdom of God Ministries. The station used to broadcast Catholic religious programming and Catholic themed programming like music shows, and youth programming, as well as local religious programming such as Born Anew, hosted by Sister Sue Jenkins.

The station, as well as Kingdom of God Ministries, was founded by Sister Sue Jenkins, a Catholic nun. The station also had a low-power repeater in Kokomo, Indiana, WKGK-LP (channel 50). WKGK's operations became intermittent after losing its transmitter site in December 2004, signing on only to preserve the broadcast license; after last operating on March 14, 2012, the station informed the Federal Communications Commission (FCC) on April 4, 2013, that it would not be able to resume operations until April 11, resulting in the WKGK license being canceled on April 17.

Kingdom of God is also the licensee of W51DU channel 51, a former Trinity Broadcasting Network repeater in Lafayette, Indiana. TBN took W51DU silent March 25, 2010 due to declining support, which has been attributed to the digital transition. TBN would later sell the station to the Minority Media and Television Council, which in turn would sell the station to Kingdom of God, with the intent of using the translator to repeat programming from WKOG.

The station had announced plans to build a new satellite broadcasting center in Indianapolis. It would house a satellite uplink facility, which it would use to launch a new international ministry. The new satellite station would predominantly air evangelical Catholic programming. It is not known if the station was to keep its affiliation with EWTN when this happens.

On August 10, 2015, the FCC cancelled WKOG-LP's license and deleted the WKOG-LP call sign due to the station having been either silent or broadcasting from unauthorized facilities since 2009.

References

External links
Official site
EWTN Official Site

KOG-LP
Television channels and stations established in 1986
Television channels and stations disestablished in 2015
Defunct television stations in the United States
1986 establishments in Indiana
2015 disestablishments in Indiana
KOG-LP